Hildaly Dellanira Domínguez Núñez, is a pageant titleholder from Guárico, Venezuela who competed in the Miss Venezuela 2008 pageant on September 10, 2008.

Domínguez won the Miss Guárico 2008 title in a state pageant held in San Juan de los Morros, Venezuela on 5 April 2008.

References

External links
Miss Venezuela Official Website
Miss Venezuela La Nueva Era MB

1987 births
Living people
People from Guárico
Venezuelan female models